The 1996 Conference USA men's basketball tournament was held March 6–9 at The Pyramid in Memphis, Tennessee. This was the first edition of the tournament. 

Top-seeded Cincinnati defeated Marquette in the inaugural championship game, 85–84, to clinch their first Conference USA men's tournament championship.

The Bearcats, in turn, received an automatic bid to the 1996 NCAA tournament. They were joined in the tournament by fellow C-USA members Louisville, Marquette, and Memphis, who all earned at-large bids.

Format
Conference USA was formed in 1995 by eleven former members the Metro Conference and the Great Midwest Conference (Dayton, VCU, and Virginia Tech were excluded). The conference's twelfth member, Houston, was to join for the 1996–97 season. For scheduling purposes, the eleven teams were placed into one of three three- or four-team divisions (Red, White, and Blue).

All eleven teams participated in the tournament and were seeded based on their regular season conference records, regardless of division. The top five teams were given byes into the quarterfinal round, and the bottom six teams were entered into the preliminary first round.

Bracket

References

Conference USA men's basketball tournament
Tournament
Conference USA men's basketball tournament
Conference USA men's basketball tournament